Knerr is a surname. Notable people with the surname include:
 Harold Knerr (1882–1949), American comic strip creator
 Hugh J. Knerr (1887–1971), major general in the United States Air Force
 Lou Knerr (1921–1980), baseball player
 Otto Knerr (1883–1960), American gymnast
 Richard Knerr (1925–2008), American inventor